The Ministry of Agriculture, Nature and Food Quality (LNV) is the Dutch Ministry responsible for agricultural policy, food policy, food safety, fisheries, forestry, natural conservation and animal welfare. The Ministry was created in 1935 and in 2010 the department was merged with the Ministry of Economic Affairs and was named the Ministry of Economic Affairs, Agriculture and Innovation. The Ministry was reinstated in 2017; it is headed by the Minister of Agriculture, Nature and Food Quality, a member of the Cabinet of the Netherlands. The last official Minister was Henk Staghouwer he quit his job as Minister on September 5, 2022. Because he felt he didn't fit the job. Currently (as of September 5, 2022) Carola Schouten is acting Minister of Agriculture, Nature and Food Quality. She does this alongside her other Minister job.

Responsibilities
The Ministry was responsible for four fields of policy:
 Agriculture and fisheries;
 Natural conservation, open air recreation and national parks;
 Food Safety;
 Rural development.

History
The Ministry was established as a separate ministry, called "Ministry of Agriculture and Fisheries", in 1935. Agriculture and fisheries policy had previously been integrated into the Ministry of the Interior and Kingdom Relations and later into the Ministry of Water, Trade and Industry.

After the Second World War the Ministry became responsible for the rationing of food and the reconstruction of the agricultural sector. As such it became much more important. Between 1946 and 1982 the ministry was a "client"-oriented ministry, oriented at the development of the agriculture sector in accordance to the European Common Agricultural Policy. In 1982 the ministry also became responsible for natural conservation and open air recreation, which used to be part of the responsibilities of the Ministry of Culture, Recreation and Social Work. As such it became more focused on sustainable development of the agricultural sector.

In 2003 the Food and Goods Authority became part of the ministry, which was renamed Ministry of Agriculture, Nature and Food Quality.

Organisation
The Ministry has currently one Government agency and one Directorate:

 Directorate for Agriculture and Nature Policy

See also
 List of Ministers of Agriculture of the Netherlands
 Food administration

References

External links
 Ministry of Agriculture, Nature and Food Quality

Agriculture, Nature and Food Quality
Netherlands, Agriculture, Nature and Food Quality
Netherlands
Netherlands
Netherlands
Animal welfare organisations based in the Netherlands
Netherlands
Netherlands
1935 establishments in the Netherlands
Regulation in the Netherlands
Agricultural organisations based in the Netherlands